Reversing Time is the first studio album of the Greek - Turkish band Dreamtone & Iris Mavraki's Neverland, released in February 2008.  Hansi Kürsch (Blind Guardian) and Tom S. Englund (Evergrey) participated in this project.

Track listing
 "Shooting Star" (4:19)
 "To Lose the Sun" (5:53)
 "Mankind Is A Lie" (4:17)
 "Everlasting Tranquillity" (4:04)
 "Reversing Time" (4:11)
 "Black Water" (6:33)
 "Mountain of Judgement" (1:45)
 "Mountain of Joy" (4:26)
 "World Beyond These Walls" (3:53)
 "Transcending Miracle" (6:16)
 "Once Again This Life" (4:25)* (European Edition)
 "Who Asked You to Fight" (4:04)** (Japanese Edition)
Multimedia track : Video Interview* (European Edition)

Total Time - 54.18

Guest artists

Engineers
Erim Arkman, Alp Turac (ATM), Mars Studios (ethnical instruments), MIAM (orchestra recordings), Division One Studios (Tom Englund's Recordings), Gary Wehrkamp (Gary Wehrkamp's recordings), Paul Wasser & Mike Baker (Gargoyle Recording Studios - Mike Baker's Recordings), Charlie Bauerfeind (Hansi Kürsch's recordings)

References

2008 debut albums
AFM Records albums
Albums with cover art by Jean-Pascal Fournier